This list of tallest buildings in Atlantic Canada refers to the tallest buildings in the Canadian provinces of New Brunswick, Nova Scotia, Newfoundland and Labrador, and Prince Edward Island. Buildings in five cities are included in this list; Halifax, Moncton, Saint John, Fredericton, and St. John's, each having buildings at least 60 meters tall. The tallest building in the Atlantic provinces is the 35-storey, The Vüze located in Halifax.

Tallest buildings
This list ranks buildings in Atlantic Canada that stand at least 60 m (197 ft) tall, based on CTBUH height measurement standards. This includes spires and architectural details but does not include antenna masts. An equal sign (=) following a rank indicates the same height between two or more buildings. Freestanding observation and/or telecommunication towers, while not habitable buildings, are included for comparison purposes; however, they are not ranked. One such tower is the Bell Aliant Tower.

Tallest buildings under construction or proposed

Under construction
As of October 2019, there are no buildings under construction in Atlantic Canada that stand at least 60 m (197 ft) tall.

Proposed

Timeline of tallest buildings

See also

 Architecture of Canada
 Canadian Centre for Architecture
 Society of Architectural Historians
 List of tallest buildings in Canada

References

Atlantic Canada